Jayden Ian Bogle (born 27 July 2000) is an English professional footballer who plays for Championship club Sheffield United.

Club career

Early career
Bogle started his career in the youth setup at Reading, before being released at the age of 14. He then joined Swindon Тown only playing there for 10 months before, joining Derby County's youth setup on 20 January 2016, ahead of leaving full-time education in the summer. After he joined Derby, Bogle mainly featured for the under-18s during the 2016−17 & 2017–18 seasons, with sporadic appearances in the under-23 Premier League 2 side. In February 2018, Bogle signed a new contract with Derby until end of the 2018–19 season. At the end of the 2017–18, Bogle was promoted to the first team squad ahead of the 2018–19 season.

Under new manager Frank Lampard, Bogle featured regularly for the first team in pre season of the 2018–19 season, his performance earned the praise of central defender Curtis Davies, who stated that he looked like a "first team player". Bogle featured as an unused substitute in Derby's first game of the Championship campaign at Reading. He made his senior debut on 14 August 2018, in a 2–0 win at Oldham Athletic in a first round EFL Cup tie, playing the full 90 minutes, where he received praise from Lampard for his performance. On 18 August, Bogle made his league debut starting in the 1–2 loss at Millwall, playing the whole game. Bogle committed his future to Derby County by signing a new four-year contract on 27 September 2018. Jayden Bogle scored his first senior goal in a 3–3 draw to Brentford, at Griffin Park.

Sheffield United
On 7 September 2020, Sheffield United announced the signing of Bogle on a four-year contract. On 20 December 2020, Bogle scored on his league debut for the Blades as a substitute for Rhian Brewster in a 1–1 away draw against Brighton & Hove Albion.

International career
In May 2019, Bogle received his first call up to the England U20 squad for the 2019 Toulon Tournament and made his debut during the 4–0 win over Guatemala on 11 June 2019.

Career statistics

References

External links

2000 births
Living people
English footballers
Association football defenders
Derby County F.C. players
Sheffield United F.C. players
English Football League players
Premier League players
Black British sportspeople